Mamadou Bah (born 9 January 1999) is a Guinean swimmer. He competed in the men's 50 metre freestyle at the 2020 Summer Olympics.

References

External links
 

1999 births
Living people
Guinean male swimmers
Guinean male freestyle swimmers
Olympic swimmers of Guinea
Swimmers at the 2020 Summer Olympics
Place of birth missing (living people)